Antonio Correr, O.P. (1378–1445) was a Roman Catholic prelate who served as Bishop of Ceneda (1409–1445) and Bishop of Asolo (1406–1409).

Biography
Antonio Correr was born in 1378 and ordained a priest in the Order of Preachers. On 24 May 1406, he was appointed during the papacy of Pope Innocent VII as Bishop of Asolo. On 15 Jul 1409, he was appointed during the papacy of Pope Gregory XII as Bishop of Ceneda. He served as Bishop of Ceneda until his death in 1445. While bishop, he was the principal co-consecrator of Antonio Correr, Bishop of Modon (1407).

References

External links and additional sources
 (for Chronology of Bishops) 
 (for Chronology of Bishops) 

15th-century Italian Roman Catholic bishops
Bishops appointed by Pope Innocent VII
Bishops appointed by Pope Gregory XII
Antonio
1378 births
1445 deaths